Nihal Singh, also known as Naval Singh and Nawal Singh (2 October, 1756 - 11 August 1775), was the fourth son of Suraj Mal and regent of his nephew Keshri Singh, from 11 April 1769 to his death. He was appointed as a Regent king for Bharatpur, since his older brother Ratan Singh died and Ratan Singh's son Keshri Singh was only 2-and-1/2-years-old.  However Keshri Singh died from chicken pox after a few years.  After Keshri Singh's death, Naval Singh became the king of Bharatpur. Some people believe that he died on 11 August 1775, from wounds received in battle against the Maratha; but this is not true, Naval Singh ruled Bharatpur very efficiently, but later on he renounced his kingdom and became a saint at Ram Galolaji's Asharam in Ayodhya.

See also
Bharatpur State

References 

Bharatpur, Rajasthan
1775 deaths
Year of birth unknown
History of Bharatpur, Rajasthan